The Dahan Stronghold is a former fort in Nangan Township, Lienchiang County, Taiwan.

History
The construction of the stronghold began in 1975 by the Republic of China Armed Forces and completed on 29 March 1976. After Matsu Islands was transferred from military to civilian, the structure was administered by Matsu National Scenic Area Administration and was redeveloped for tourism. Renovation was completed in 2006 and it was opened to the public on 10 February 2007.

Architecture
The stronghold consists of three levels, in which the upper level was for the military headquarter, middle level was for accommodation and machine gun reserves and the lower level was for anti-aircraft guns, briefing room and storerooms. It forms a tunnel with a width of 1.2-2 meters, height of 2 meters and length of 430 meters.

See also
 List of tourist attractions in Taiwan

References

1976 establishments in Taiwan
Forts in Lienchiang County
Military installations established in 1976
Nangang Township